The Hyundai Gulliver 1998–99 Professional Basketball season was the third season of the Korean Basketball League.

Regular season

Playoffs

Prize money
Daejeon Hyundai Dynat: KRW 150,000,000 (champions + regular-season 1st place)
Busan Kia Enterprise: KRW 80,000,000 (runners-up + regular-season 2nd place)
Incheon Daewoo Zeus: KRW 20,000,000 (regular-season 3rd place)

External links
Official KBL website (Korean & English)

1998–99
1998–99 in South Korean basketball
1998–99 in Asian basketball leagues